Podgora, also known in Italian as Monte Calvario, is a hill on the Karst plateau west of Gorizia, on the right bank of the Isonzo, with an elevation of 241 meters above sea level. Due to its commanding position over the Isonzo valley and the Gorizia plain, it was the theatre of bitter fighting during the First World War, from June 1915 to August 1916.

Along with Sabotin and San Michele, Podgora was one of the main bulwarks of the Austro-Hungarian defense of Gorizia during the early battles of the Isonzo, being heavily fortified with multiple orders of trenches, barbed wire and machine-gun posts. The Podgora was repeatedly attacked by Italian troops in June 1915, before and during the First Battle of the Isonzo, without success, and in July, before and during the Second Battle of the Isonzo, when a regiment of Carabinieri managed to make some gains. Further advance occurred in October 1915, during the Third Battle of the Isonzo, and in November, during the Fourth Battle of the Isonzo. The summit was finally captured by the "Casale" Infantry Brigade on 8 August 1916, during the Sixth Battle of the Isonzo; Gorizia fell shortly thereafter.

References

Landforms of Friuli-Venezia Giulia
Karst
Mountains of the Alps
Hills of Italy
Military history of Italy during World War I